Sinématiali Department is a department of Poro Region in Savanes District, Ivory Coast. In 2021, its population was 74,981 and its seat is the settlement of Sinématiali. The sub-prefectures of the department are Bouakaha, Kagbolodougou, Sédiogo, and Sinématiali.

History
Sinématiali Department was created in 2008 as second-level subdivision via a split-off from Korhogo Department. At its creation, it was part of Savanes Region.

In 2011, districts were introduced as new first-level subdivisions of Ivory Coast. At the same time, regions were reorganised and became second-level subdivisions and all departments were converted into third-level subdivisions. At this time, Sinématiali Department became part of Poro Region in Savanes District.

Notes

Departments of Poro Region
2008 establishments in Ivory Coast
States and territories established in 2008